Club Atlético Las Palmas is a sports club, located in Córdoba, Argentina. Although other sports are practised there (including basketball, tennis, and hockey) the club is mostly known for its football team, which currently plays in the regionalised 4th level of Argentine football league system, the Torneo Argentino B.

See also
List of football clubs in Argentina
Argentine football league system

External links
Official website 

 
Football clubs in Córdoba Province, Argentina
Association football clubs established in 1933
Sport in Córdoba, Argentina
1933 establishments in Argentina